John Eppel was born in Lydenburg, South Africa. He moved to Colleen Bawn, a small mining town in the south of Southern Rhodesia (now Zimbabwe), at the age of four. He was educated at Milton High School in Bulawayo, and later attended the University of Natal in South Africa, where he completed his English master's degree in 'A Study of Keatsian Dialectics'. He married at the age of 34 and has three children; Ben, Ruth and Joe. His ex-wife, Shari, is a poet and prominent human rights activist. Eppel teaches English at Christian Brothers College, Bulawayo.

He has published 20 books, one of which has been translated into French (The giraffe man), created a creative writing course for the University of South Africa and published three 'O'Level and one 'A' Level literature study guides. He was awarded the Ingrid Jonker Prize for his first poetry book, "Spoils of War" and the MNet Prize in 1993  for his Novel, 'D G G Berry's the Great North Road'. His second novel, 'Hatchings' was nominated for the MNet prize in 1993/4.

His works are studied in universities across South Africa.

List of Published Books 

Making Whoopie (Online)
Not the Whispering Wild (Pigeon Press)
The Boy who loved Camping (Pigeon Press)
Poems of Resistance (Mwanaka Publishing)
Traffickings (InkSword)
 "O Suburbia", Weaver Press
 "White Man Walking", Mwanaka Publishing
 "Landlocked", Smith/Doorstep
 "Textures" (with Togara Muzanenhamo), 'amaBooks.
 "Hewn From Rock" (with Philani Nyoni)
 "Together" (with Julius Chingono), 'amaBooks/UNO Press/UKZN Press.
 "Absent: The English Teacher", Jacana.
 "White Man Crawling", (2007) 'amaBooks.
 "Hatchings" (reprint), Republished by 'amaBooks.
 "Songs My Country Taught Me", Weaver Press.
 "The Caruso of Collen Bawn and other short writings", 'amaBooks.
 "The Holy Innocents", 'amaBooks.
 "The Curse of the Ripe Tomato", 'amaBooks.
 "Selected poems 1965-1995", Childline.
 "Sonata for Matabeleland", Snailpress/Baobab Books.
 "The Giraffe Man", Quelliere.
 "Hatchings" Carrefour.
 "D G G Berry's The Great North Road", Carrefour/Hippogriff (1992) (Recently re-published in E-Book format on Amazon).
 "Spoils of War", (1989) Carrefour.
 "Four Voices" (with N.H. Brettell, Rowland Molony, and David Wright) Books of Zimbabwe.

External links 
 'amaBooks, Zimbabwe
 Zimbabwe poetry
 Poetry international
 Weaver press, Zimbabwe
 Jacana Books, South Africa
 John Eppel Google+ Profile
 John Eppel Books Live Profile

References

1947 births
Living people
People from Lydenburg
Zimbabwean novelists
Male novelists
Zimbabwean poets
Zimbabwean male writers
South African male poets
Rhodesian novelists
Rhodesian poets
University of Natal alumni
South African emigrants to Rhodesia
White Rhodesian people
Zimbabwean educators
20th-century Zimbabwean writers
21st-century Zimbabwean writers